The Harris County Courthouse is a historic courthouse building located  in Hamilton, Georgia. Built in 1908, it was designed by Georgia-born American architect Edward Columbus Hosford. He is noted for his designs of courthouses and other buildings found in Florida, Georgia and Texas. Harris County's was the second courthouse he had ever designed.

On September 18, 1980, the building was added to the National Register of Historic Places.

See also
 National Register of Historic Places listings in Harris County, Georgia
 Harris County Courthouse (disambiguation)

References

External links 
 National Register listings for Harris County
 Carl Vinson Institute of Government listing for Harris County Courthouse

Courthouses on the National Register of Historic Places in Georgia (U.S. state)
Buildings and structures in Harris County, Georgia
County courthouses in Georgia (U.S. state)
Edward Columbus Hosford buildings
Neoclassical architecture in Georgia (U.S. state)
National Register of Historic Places in Harris County, Georgia